Polites origenes, the crossline skipper, is a butterfly in the family Hesperiidae. It is found in the eastern United States, excepting Florida, southern Ontario, and Quebec.

The wingspan is 23–30 mm.

There is one generation in Canada from late June into mid-August, with two in the U.S.

The larvae feed on grasses, including redtop grass (Tridens flavus) and little bluestem (Andropogon scoparius). Adults feed on flower nectar.

References

External links

Crossline Skipper, Butterflies and Moths of North America

Butterflies of North America
Polites (butterfly)
Taxa named by Johan Christian Fabricius
Butterflies described in 1793